The Deutsche Gesellschaft für Kardiologie (DGK; German Cardiac Society in English) is a German medical research organization based in Düsseldorf.  It is a member of the European Society of Cardiology, and the World Heart Federation.

They award the Arthur Weber Prize for excellence in the field of cardiology.

References

Medical and health organisations based in North Rhine-Westphalia
Heart disease organizations